Phlyctis argena is a species of crustose lichen.

Description
Phlyctis argena has a thin crustose thallus that is white, greyish or green-grey in colour. The identification can be confirmed with the spot test application a drop of potassium hydroxide (K-test) to the thallus, which will turn yellow and then red.

Range

Widespread, including Africa, Asia, Europa and North America.

Habitat

Phlyctis argena usually grows as a generalist epiphyte on the bark of deciduous trees, especially Salix cinerea and Fraxinus excelsior.
It also occasionally grows on stone, such as gravestones.

Ecology

The lichen is a generalist epiphyte of deciduous trees and is acidophilic. Its abundance appears to have increased generally since the 1970s, possibly in responses to changes in pollution levels

Etymology

The etymology of the genus name, Phlyctis, comes from the obsolete medical term phlyctidium, meaning a large blister. The species epithet, argena, is derived from the latin "argentum", meaning silver.

Taxonomy
The following varieties of Phlyctis argena  have been described:
 Phlyctis argena var. argena
 Phlyctis argena var. gilvoalbicans
 Phlyctis argena var. erythrosora
 Phlyctis argena var. nubilosa

References

Gyalectales
Lichen species
Lichens of Africa
Lichens of Asia
Lichens of North America
Taxa named by Erik Acharius
Lichens described in 1799
Lichens of Europe